André Huguenin (12 March 1929 – 11 December 2007) was a Swiss cross-country skier. He competed in the men's 30 kilometre event at the 1956 Winter Olympics.

References

External links
 

1929 births
2007 deaths
Swiss male cross-country skiers
Olympic cross-country skiers of Switzerland
Cross-country skiers at the 1956 Winter Olympics
Place of birth missing
20th-century Swiss people